Edwin Willis may refer to:

 Edwin E. Willis (1904–1972), American politician and attorney from Louisiana
 Edwin B. Willis (1893–1963), film set designer and decorator
 Edwin O'Neill Willis (1935–2015), American ornithologist